Martello Tower is a rock  high, lying in King George Bay  north-north-west of Lions Rump, in the South Shetland Islands of Antarctica. It was charted in 1937 by Discovery Investigations personnel on the Discovery II, who named it after the fortified towers of that name.

References

Rock formations of Antarctica